They're Playing with Fire is a 1984 American erotic-horror-thriller film directed by Howard Avedis and starring Sybil Danning, Eric Brown, Andrew Prine, and Paul Clemens. The film borrows some elements from 1974's The Teacher.

Plot
Vivacious English literature professor, Dr. Diane Stevens (Sybil Danning), sun tans on her yacht 'Lillian', before heading off to the Ocean View College where she teaches Macbeth. After the lesson, she asks her student Jay Richard (Eric Brown) if he's looking for work to which Jay confirms. Later that day, Diane continues to sun tan in her bikini while Jay varnishes the entire exterior woodwork of the yacht. Concerned, she invites him in for a cold drink and persuades him to French kiss her. When Jay complies, Diane seduces him further by taking him to her bed and they engage in sexual intercourse. While having sex, Jay questions about Prof. Michael, Diane's husband, (Andrew Prine) finding out but Diane promises that she won't tell him. As she drives Jay to the gas station where he works Diane asks Jay to do her a favor.

At their house Diane and Michael discuss plans to use Jay in order to get a large inheritance from Lillian and Lettie Stevens, Michael's mother and grandmother, who want to get rid of the pair. Michael says that they should wait, however Diane admits her boredom and warns Michael that come summer she's leaving. The next day at college Diane and Michael convince Jay to scare Lillian and Lettie out of the house so they can put them in a retirement home to which Jay agrees. At the house Lillian asks George the gardener and handyman if he is going to see Martin that night to which he says no. Lillian tells George about how they've got to talk as "it's" getting out of control. Lillian explains to Lettie how that they've got to solve "our problem". Jay's attempt at scaring the couple out of the house is thwarted when the family dog starts barking and Lillian chases him away by shooting at him with a rifle. Shortly after, Lillian and Lettie are assassinated by an unknown assailant. Jay runs to the boatyard and explains what happened to Diane and Michael. Michael grows suspicious of Jay when he phones home but gets no answer. The trio head to the house where they discover the two were murdered. Michael accuses Jay while Jay in turn accuses Michael of wanting to frame him. Jay promises he won't go to the police but vows to find out who committed the murder.

The next day Michael uses a lesson on abnormal psychology to torment Jay who goes to Diane telling her to get Michael off his case and voices that he knows she was just using him. He also lets her know of the millions of dollars in inheritance money which is why they're not going to the cops. Later, his girlfriend Cynthia, tries to blackmail him by threatening to show pictures of him and Diane on the yacht together to Michael and everyone on campus. Jay blows her off. Cynthia goes round to Michael's house to show him the photos but reconsiders. George inquires the whereabouts of Lillian and Lettie to which Michael lies saying they've gone to Hawaii. After Diane visits him at the gas station Jay investigates the cabin of the yacht. Diane comes round and he shows her he found a fragment of television screen glass and blood on a pair of trainers as well as a gun and bills of thousands of dollars paid to a children's psychiatric hospital in Switzerland. Diane tells Jay not to go to the police as he will be suspected instead of Michael and warns him that Michael is capable of violence. This convinces Jay and the two reconcile and proceeds to cuddle and kiss passionately.

Later, a drunk Michael confronts Diane and accuses her of having sex with Jay. Diane tells him that Jay has found evidence against him including his gun and is spying on them. Angered, Michael goes to Jay who's on campus and tells him he can't go to the police as he's got no alibi. Jay goes to Lillian and Lettie's house to try and get rid of his fingerprints but is chased away by the same assailant who murdered them. The next day Jay tells Diane about what happened, Diane informs Jay that the gardener is Lillian's cousin. Cynthia revisits Michael's house to show him the photos of Jay and Diane but is killed by the assailant dressed as Santa Claus. On campus, Diane sees Michael paying off George. Michael tells Diane that she killed Lillian and Lettie, plans on killing Jay as he's the only witness and is conspiring against him to get the entire inheritance for herself. Michael also states that he and her are through as he knows Diane and Jay are intimate. Diane calls Jay and informs him of their fight. She asks if he wants her to come over to which Jay says yes. Diane comes over and tells Jay that she is divorcing Michael. She states that Michael blames Jay for their breaking up but their relationship was over before she met Jay as Lillian saw to that. Diane meets Jay in his apartment and they have erotic sex.

Michael comes around but Diane manages to elude him and, after convincing him she was never there, Jay follows suit. Michael then sees Diane's car and comes back but by this time Diane and Jay are on the yacht. Diane admits she needs Jay who, in turn, confesses his love for her. Michael tracks them down and prepares to shoot Jay but relents. The unknown assailant appears and then kills Michael. Diane and Jay chase him to the mansion. There, George confronts him revealing his name to be Martin. Martin tells him that his doctor said that he has a disease and it is terminal and reveals that he killed his mother and grandmother. George tells him that it was he who convinced them to fly him from Switzerland so he could inherit the fortune instead of Michael and Diane. An angry and disillusioned Martin kills George believing he only cares about the money. Diane and Jay look around and find Martin's photo album and medical records. They realize that George and Lillian had an illegitimate child and if he's still alive he'll inherit the fortune then find a diagnostic medical record paper from Martin's doctor in Switzerland and discover that Martin is suffering from Huntington's chorea for which he is terminal.

The two go to the attic where Martin locks them in. They find the bodies of Cynthia, Lillian and Lettie and are then told by Martin that he killed Michael because if they found out about him they'd get rid of him and he now plans to kill Diane. Jay and Diane try to escape via the attic window but Martin comes up from behind to kill them. Jay shoots him with a rifle he armed himself with earlier. As Diane is about to unmask Martin he tries to choke her. Jay shoots him again, this time killing him. Diane unmasks Martin revealing him to be 'Bird', a school friend of Jay, Cynthia, Glenn, Janice and Dale with whom Jay has shared his dormitory and rent.

Summer rolls around and Diane visits Jay at work. She tells him she's leaving town for a while on a vacation. Diane asks Jay to drive her to the airport and gives him her car as a form of gratitude and because she needs his help as if it weren't for him she wouldn't be around to enjoy the large inheritance. She then invites Jay to come with her to Hawaii. Jay ecstatically accepts. As Jay's boss, Jimbo, threatens to fire him again, the two drive off to the airport to enjoy their romantic holiday together.

Cast
 Sybil Danning as Dr. Diane Stevens, a sexy English literature professor at Ocean View Campus, California
 Eric Brown as Jay Richard, a young, smart undergrad student
 Beth Scheffell as	Cynthia, Jay's girlfriend
 Paul Clemens as Martin 'Bird' Johnson, Jay & Cynthia's friend
 Andrew Prine as Prof. Michael Stevens, Senior Professor of Psychology and husband of Dr. Diane 
 K.T. Stevens as Lillian Stevens, mother of Prof. Michael
 Margaret Wheeler as Lettie Stevens, grandmother of Prof. Michael
 Gene Bicknell as George Johnson, the gardener and handyman of the Stevens family
 Violet Manes as Jenny, maid of the Stevens family
 Alvy Moore as Jimbo, a gas station owner who employs Jay part time
 Dominick Brascia as Glenn, Jay & Cynthia's friend
 Greg Kaye	as Dale, Jay & Cynthia's friend
 Suzanne Kennedy as Janice, Jay & Cynthia's friend
 Bill Conklin as Preacher
 Curt Ayers as The Bartender
 Terese Hanses	as Pub Singer
 Joe Portaro as Professor
 Marlene Schmidt as Gas Station Customer

Release
They\re Playing with Fire premiered in Los Angeles on April 27, 1984. On its release, several reviews, including the Los Angeles Times and The Hollywood Reporter advised that the print advertisement was misleading as it suggested a “sex romp” opposed to a “horror-thriller.”

References

External links

1984 films
1980s horror thriller films
1980s English-language films
American horror thriller films
Adultery in films
Films shot in California
New World Pictures films
1980s American films